This is a chronological list of MEWF tag team champions. The MEWF Tag Team Championship is the oldest championship title in the Mid-Eastern Wrestling Federation having been established when the Lords of Darkness (Pain and Agony) defeated Cream Team (Dino Casanova and Rip Sawyer) at the MEWF's first show in Pasadena, Maryland on August 2, 1991. The titles were later unified with the MCW Tag Team Championship during Maryland Championship Wrestling's last show on July 16, 2003.

The championship has been known as:
MEWF Tag Team Championship (1991 – 2003) 
MEWF Unified Tag Team Championship (2003 – 2004)

The tag team title was later revived after Maryland Championship Wrestling began promoting events in the Maryland-area in 2007.

Title history

References

External links
Official Tag Team Championship Title History 
MEWF Tag Team Championship history at Solie.org

Tag team wrestling championships